Black Hawk Lake or Blackhawk Lake may refer to:

Black Hawk Lake (Sac County, Iowa), a glacially-formed lake
Blackhawk Lake (Minnesota), a lake in Dakota County